Stenorista is a genus of moths of the family Crambidae described by Paul Dognin in 1905.

Species
Stenorista elongalis Dognin, 1905
Stenorista fortunata (Schaus, 1912)

References

Spilomelinae
Crambidae genera
Taxa named by Paul Dognin